Testosterone is a 2007 Polish comedy film directed by Tomasz Konecki and Andrzej Saramonowicz.

Cast 
 Cezary Kosiński − Janis
 Maciej Stuhr − Tretyn
 Tomasz Karolak − Fistach
 Piotr Adamczyk − Kornel
 Borys Szyc − Tytus
 Tomasz Kot − Robal
 Krzysztof Stelmaszyk − Stavros

References

External links 

2007 comedy films
2007 films
Polish comedy films
2000s Polish-language films